Dumisane Hlaselo (born 8 June 1989) is a South African middle-distance runner competing primarily in the 1500 metres. He represented his country at the 2015 World Championships in Athletics in Beijing narrowly missing the semifinals.

International competitions

Personal bests

Outdoor
800 metres – 1:48.31 (Pretoria 2008)
1500 metres – 3:36.36 (Tomblaine 2015)
One mile – 4:13.49 (Port Elizabeth 2014)
3000 metres – 7:59.31 (Stellenbosch 2013)
5000 metres – 13:47.23 (Stellenbosch 2013)

Indoor
One mile – 4:00.97 (College Station 2011)
3000 metres – 8:00.43 (Fayetteville 2011)

References

External links

All-Athletics profile

1989 births
Living people
South African male middle-distance runners
World Athletics Championships athletes for South Africa
Athletes (track and field) at the 2015 African Games
Place of birth missing (living people)
African Games competitors for South Africa
20th-century South African people
21st-century South African people